The 1994 Tampa Bay Buccaneers season was the franchise's 19th season in the National Football League (NFL). The year began with the death of owner Hugh Culverhouse. Ownership was transferred to a three-man board of trustees. Season ticket sales dwindled, and rumors of the team's location were a persistent distraction all year. At mid-season, the new ownership removed all personnel responsibilities from coach Sam Wyche, and gave them to Vice President Rich McKay, who they named general manager. They also put the team up for sale. On the field, Errict Rhett became the first rookie in the team's history to rush for 1,000 yards, despite not starting until the ninth game of the season. 

The Buccaneers had one of the weakest offenses in the league, even while led by a coach who had consistently produced top offenses while with the Cincinnati Bengals. At 2–9, most people in the Bay area were ready to hang Wyche and pack his bags, but the defensive line improved as Eric Curry finally matured in the second half of the season, and the Bucs began their first 4-game winning streak in 15 years. It started with an overtime win against the Minnesota Vikings. Two wins over the Washington Redskins and one over the Los Angeles Rams set up a big game in Tampa against the Green Bay Packers, who were trying to secure a playoff spot. "We've arrived", Wyche announced prematurely.  The final game was called "Orange Pride day", and was attended by 65,000 fans (although many were rooting for the visitors), most of whom expected it to be the last football game in Tampa. The Packers won, 34–19.

Offseason

NFL Draft

Preseason
The Tampa Bay Buccaneers went 2-2 in the pre-season, winning their first game against the Bengals at home. After a loss to Seattle Seahawks on the road, the Bucs beat cross state rival Miami Dolphins in game three. The last game of the preseason was lost to the New York Jets by one point. Expectations were for a break even season in 1994.

Personnel

Staff

Roster

Regular season

Schedule

Notes:
Division opponents in bold text

 = blacked out locally

Standings

Season summary

Week 13 at Vikings

References

Tampa Bay Buccaneers season
Tampa Bay Buccaneers
20th century in Tampa, Florida
Tampa Bay Buccaneers seasons